Thilo Stralkowski (born 2 May 1987) is a German field hockey coach and former player.

At the 2012 Summer Olympics, he competed for the national team in the men's tournament, where they won the gold medal. In 2020 he retired from playing hockey and became the head coach of his club Uhlenhorst Mülheim.

References

External links
 

1987 births
Living people
German male field hockey players
Male field hockey forwards
Field hockey players at the 2012 Summer Olympics
2014 Men's Hockey World Cup players
Olympic field hockey players of Germany
Olympic gold medalists for Germany
Olympic medalists in field hockey
Sportspeople from Essen
Medalists at the 2012 Summer Olympics
HTC Uhlenhorst Mülheim players
German field hockey coaches
21st-century German people